WRAR-FM is a hot adult contemporary formatted broadcast radio station licensed to Tappahannock, Virginia, serving the Northern Neck.  WRAR-FM is owned and operated by Real Media, Inc.

History
The station signed on in 1971, as a sister station to WRAR-AM, and has been a contemporary music station since its beginning.  The station used live air personalities during the 1970s and 1980s, but relied on syndicated programming during the 1990s. In the 1980s, WRAR was an affiliate of Rick Dees Weekly Top 40. In the last several years, the station has returned to the use of live local announcers once again.

Notable alumni
 Mike Friend: one of the founders of non-commercial WNRN in Charlottesville, VA.
 Steve "Mr. Beach" Leonard: after stops at WMXB and WRCL, is now at WJFN-FM.
 Jim Payne: later Operations Manager and Middays at WRVQ in Richmond, VA.

References

External links
 105-5 WRAR Online
 

RAR-FM
Hot adult contemporary radio stations in the United States
Radio stations established in 1971
1971 establishments in Virginia